Vermicularia radicula, common name the northern wormsnail, is a species of sea snail, a marine gastropod mollusk in the family Turritellidae.

Distribution

Description 
The maximum recorded shell length is 61 mm.

Habitat 
Minimum recorded depth is 5.5 m. Maximum recorded depth is 18 m.

References

Turritellidae
Gastropods described in 1851